Taylor David Moore (born 12 May 1997) is an English professional footballer who plays for Shrewsbury Town, on loan from Bristol City. He is a defender, playing in the right-back or centre-back positions.

Club career

Early career

Moore was born in Walthamstow in East London, but moved to France as a seven-year-old. Moore spent a year in the academy of his local side West Ham United before moving to France. Upon arriving in France, he joined amateur club Etaples before joining the academy at RC Lens at the age of 12.

Lens
Having made a progression through the RC Lens' academy, Moore signed his first professional contract with the club on 8 December 2014.

On 3 May 2015, with Antoine Kombouaré as coach, he made his first-team debut for Lens, starting in an away derby match against Lille playing out of position at right back and producing an assist for his team's only goal in a 3–1 loss. Moore went on to make four appearances in the 2014–15 season.

In the 2015–16 season, Moore made five appearances for the club. However, his first team opportunities were limited after he fell out of favour with manager Kombouaré and was sent to play in the reserves. Despite this, Moore was the subject of a €10 million transfer bid from Lyon in the January transfer window. RC Lens rejected the bid, demanding €15 million instead. Moore was expected to leave the club by the end of the January transfer window, but no club made an offer and he stayed at the club for the rest of the season.

Ahead of the 2016–17 season, Moore's future at RC Lens became uncertain and he found himself linked with a move back to England, with Bristol City, Tottenham Hotspur, Southampton, West Ham United and Crystal Palace also showed an interest in signing him. Amid the transfer speculation, Moore was expected to fight for a first team place under the new management of Alain Casanova.

Bristol City
On 25 August 2016, Moore signed for Championship club Bristol City on a three-year contract for an undisclosed fee believed to be in the region of £1.5m. Upon joining the club, Moore revealed that then-teammate Tammy Abraham played a role in convincing him to join Bristol City. He made his debut in an  EFL Cup match away to Fulham, in which Bristol City won 2–1.

Less than a week after the January transfer window opened in 2017, Moore was loaned out to struggling League One side Bury to gain further experience.

On 30 August 2017, Moore signed for Cheltenham Town on loan until January 2018.

Moore was loaned to Scottish club Heart of Midlothian in August 2021.

Moore signed on loan for Shrewsbury Town F.C. in July 2022.

International career
Moore represented England at England U17, England U18 levels, and captained the  England U19's. He was a part of the U-17 team that won the European Championships in 2014. He has six caps for the England U20's.

Personal life
Moore has three brothers, Aston, Jaxon and Keaton. Having been raised in France since the age of seven, Moore is fluent in French.

Career statistics

Honours
England U17
UEFA European U-17 Championship: 2014

References

External links

 National team stats at TheFA.com
 

Living people
1997 births
Footballers from Walthamstow
English footballers
Association football central defenders
Ligue 1 players
English Football League players
RC Lens players
Bristol City F.C. players
Bury F.C. players
Cheltenham Town F.C. players
Southend United F.C. players
Blackpool F.C. players
England youth international footballers
English expatriate footballers
English expatriate sportspeople in France
Expatriate footballers in France
Heart of Midlothian F.C. players
Shrewsbury Town F.C. players
Sportspeople from Pas-de-Calais
Scottish Professional Football League players